Ken Mellons is the self-titled debut album of American country music artist Ken Mellons. Released in 1994 on Epic Records, it contains his single "Jukebox Junkie", a Top Ten hit on the Billboard Hot Country Singles & Tracks (now Hot Country Songs) charts. "Workin' for the Weekend", "I Can Bring Her Back", and "Lookin' in the Same Direction" were also released as singles.

Track listing

Personnel
Ken Mellons: Lead Vocals
Curtis Young, John Wesley Ryles, Carl Jackson, Doug Clements: Background Vocals
Bobby All, Mike Elliott, Billy Joe Walker, Jr.: Acoustic Guitar
Brent Mason: Electric Guitar
John Hughey: Steel Guitar
Hank Singer: Fiddle
Steve Nathan: Keyboards
Glenn Worf: Bass guitar
Lonnie Wilson: Drums, Percussion

Production
Produced by Jerry Cupit
Recording Engineers: Marty McClantoc, Alan Schulman
Mix Engineers: Alan Schulman; assisted by Marty McClantoc & Amy Hughes
Digital Editing: Don Cobb
Mastered by Denny Purcell

Chart performance

References

External links
[ Ken Mellons] at Allmusic

1994 debut albums
Epic Records albums
Ken Mellons albums